Koppa  is a panchayat town in Chikkamagaluru district in the Indian state of Karnataka. It is the headquarters of Koppa sub-district.

Demographics
 India census, Koppa town had a population 4,993. Males constituted 49.2% of the population and females 50.8%.Koppa Taluka had a population 84882,  Koppa had an average literacy rate of 86.4%, higher than the national average of 74.04%: male literacy was 88%, and female literacy was 84.8%. In Koppa, 8.9% of the population was under 6 years of age.

Transport 
Koppa is well connected by road to various cities like Shimoga, Chikmagalur and Udupi.The nearest railway stations are Shivamogga(74 km), Bhadravati(70 km) and Udupi(87 km).

The nearest airport is Mangalore International Airport(129 km).

Tourism 

 Hariharapura :It is about 10 km from Koppa.Here,Sri Sharada Laxminarasimha Peetam was established by Sri Adi Shankaracharya on the banks of river Tunga.

 Meruti Gudda:It is about 45 km from Koppa town.It is the 6th highest peak in karnataka.It is located near Basarikatte village.

 Shakatapuram:It is also known by the name Bhandigadi.It is known for a Hindu Math called Shri Vidya Peetam.It is about 17 km from Koppa.

 Kuppalli:It is 11 km from Koppa town.It is famous for being birthplace and childhood home of the renowned Kannada poet  Kuvempu [ Rastrakavi].

 Kamandala Ganapathi : Kamandala Ganapathi Temple is precisely located on Siddaramata Road in Kesave village of Koppa taluk (4kms from Koppa bus stand). The iconic temple is 1000 years old with great historical significance, being lesser known though. Lord Ganesha is the holy deity of the temple which is an extremely historic temple known for its power.

References

Cities and towns in Chikkamagaluru district
Hill stations in Karnataka